Animakee Wa Zhing 37 First Nation (formerly Northwest Angle 37 First Nation, Ojibwe language: Animikii-wajiing, meaning Sacred place of the Thunderbirds) is an Anishinaabe First Nation in northwestern Ontario. It is a part of the Anishinabeg of Kabapikotawangag Resource Council, which is in turn part of the Grand Council of Treaty 3.

As of 2015, the First Nation had a registered membership of 405 people, 179 of whom were living on Animakee Wa Zhing 37 reserve lands.

Reserve lands

Leadership
In the December 2021 election, Linda McVicar was elected chief, with Don Kavanaugh, Angel Andrushuk, Lorraine Major and Theresa Noonan as councillors.

References

First Nations in Ontario
Anishinaabe tribal political organizations